Aglaia basiphylla is a species of plants in the family Meliaceae. It is endemic to Fiji.

References

External links
 Aglaia basiphylla at The Plant List
 Aglaia basiphylla A.Gray at Tropicos

Endemic flora of Fiji
basiphylla
Vulnerable plants
Taxonomy articles created by Polbot
Plants described in 1854